S29 may refer to:

Aircraft 
 Blériot-SPAD S.29, a French sport biplane
 Saab 29 Tunnan, a Swedish fighter aircraft
 Short S.29 Stirling, a British heavy bomber
 Sikorsky S-29, an American biplane airliner

Rail and transit 
 S29 (Long Island bus)
 S29 (ZVV), a regional railway line of the Zürich S-Bahn
 Neppu Station, in Kuromatsunai, Suttsu District, Hokkaido, Japan

Roads 
 County Route S29 (California)
 County Route S29 (Bergen County, New Jersey)
 Route 179 (Pennsylvania–New Jersey), partially numbered New Jersey Route S29 until 1953

Other uses 
 40S ribosomal protein S29
 British NVC community S29, a swamps and tall-herb fens community in the British National Vegetation Classification system
 , a submarine of the Royal Navy
 S29: Do not empty into drains, a safety phrase
 Sulfur-29, an isotope of sulfur
 , a submarine of the United States Navy